Anita Marie Wood Brewer (born c. 1937) (also known as Little Bitty and Little) is a TV performer, recording artist and girlfriend of Elvis Presley. She later married NFL football player Johnny Brewer. Presley and Wood met in 1957 and in the same year Presley referred to Wood as his "No. 1 Girl". The two dated seriously for several years from 1957 to 1962. Wood signed a contract to work as an actress for Paramount Pictures, but later gave it up for Presley. In 1976, Johnny Brewer sued the Memphis Publishing Company for libel when it reported that Anita Brewer was divorced from Brewer and reunited with Presley in Las Vegas.  Anita Wood appeared on the Larry King show in 2005 to talk about her romance with Elvis Presley.

Anita recorded for ABC-Paramount (1958); Sun (1961); and Santo (1963). She also worked on The Andy Williams Show (summer 1958) and is the uncredited vocalist with Williams on "Hawaiian Wedding Song", a Top 15 hit in early 1959.

See also
 Relationships of Elvis Presley

References

1937 births
Living people
American women pop singers
21st-century American women